George Purcell White (died 1929) was Archdeacon  of Cashel from 1922 and of Emly from 1928; after which the Archdeaconries merged.

He was educated  at Trinity College, Dublin and ordained in 1895. His first post was as Curate of St Mark, Cork. He was Rector of Templemore from 1903; and Prebendary of Fennor in Cashel Cathedral from 1912; .

His father was Dean of Cashel  from 1890 to 1908.

References

1929 deaths
Alumni of Trinity College Dublin
Archdeacons of Cashel and Emly
Irish Anglicans
Place of birth missing
Place of death missing
Year of birth missing